Dundurn is a town of 647 residents surrounded by the RM of Dundurn No. 314, in the Canadian province of Saskatchewan. Dundurn is located on Highway 11, or Louis Riel Trail, in central Saskatchewan, about 42 km south of Saskatoon.

The town is situated between Highway 11 and the north end of Brightwater Lake, with Swamp Lake  directly north of town. Dundurn is run under a mayor-council form of civic governance.

The land location of Dundurn is Sec.32, Twp.32, R.4, W3 in 1894 / Sec.9, Twp.33, R.4, W3.

History
The Regina Branch of the Canadian National Railway (CNR) came through in 1889.

Demographics 

Education
Students in kindergarten to grade six are able to attend school at Dundurn Elementary School. After graduation, students can acquire further education in Hanley, Saskatchewan at Hanley Composite School, which is a kindergarten to grade 12 school.

Sites of interest

Between 1969 and 1970, Mount Blackstrap was constructed as a ski hill to host the 1971 Canada Winter Games, which were awarded to Saskatoon. The ski hill remained open to the public until 2008 and is now abandoned.

The unincorporated areas of Indi, Strehlow, and Haultain are located within  of Dundurn, but not much is left of these rail towns and sidings.  
  
Dakota Dunes Casino and associated Dakota Dunes Links Golf course is nearby on the Whitecap Dakota First Nation. The casino and convention centre opened in 2007. CFB Dundurn Golf Club is located at CFD Dundurn, a short distance from the town of Dundurn.

The roadside attractions Bone Gatherer and Horse and Wagon are two additions on Highway 11.

Wilson Museum which is hosted in three buildings one of which is the Woodview School is located in the town of Dundurn.

Heritage buildings
The town has three designated heritage properties:
Dundurn Community Centre (formerly Dundurn School or Old Brick School) - The building was built in 1916, by the Bigelow Bros. with R. M. Thomson as the architect.  The building served as a school from 1916 until 1980.  Today the building is used as a community centre.
Old Bank Building (formally Northern Bank; Northern Crown Bank; Dundurn Post Office) - Originally built 1906 as a two-story wood-frame bank building housing the Northern Bank (Canada), Northern Crown Bank and Royal Bank.  The building housed a post office from 1935 until 1957.
Dundurn Moravian Brethren Church (also called the United Church of Dundurn building) - The church was constructed as a joint church building housing the  Anglican, Methodist, Presbyterian, and Moravian members communities.  The church was a joint-stock company owned by the member denominations.

References

External links

Dundurn No. 314, Saskatchewan
Towns in Saskatchewan
Division No. 11, Saskatchewan